Mentzelia dispersa is a species of flowering plant in the family Loasaceae known by the common name bushy blazingstar. It is native to western North America from British Columbia to California to the Dakotas, where it grows in many types of habitat.

Description
It is an annual herb producing an erect stem up to nearly half a meter in maximum height. The leaves are divided into lobes and teeth, the longest in the basal rosette approaching 10 centimeters long and those higher on the stem reduced in size.

The lightly hairy inflorescence is an open cluster of flowers each with five small, shiny yellow petals a few millimeters long. The fruit is a narrow, straight or curving  utricle up to 2.5 centimeters long which contains many tiny angular seeds.

External links
Jepson Manual Treatment
Photo gallery

dispersa
Flora of British Columbia
Flora of the Western United States
Natural history of the California Coast Ranges
Natural history of the Central Valley (California)
Natural history of the Peninsular Ranges
Taxa named by Sereno Watson
Flora without expected TNC conservation status